378th may refer to:

378th Bombardment Group, inactive United States Army Air Forces unit
378th Fighter Squadron, active United States Air Force unit
378th Troop Carrier Squadron, inactive United States Air Force unit

See also
378 (number)
378, the year 378 (CCCLXXVIII) of the Julian calendar
378 BC